Argyria or Argyra (Ἀργυρά) was a town of ancient Pontus, located 20 stadia east of Tripolis. It was noted for its silver mines, whence the town's name (άργυρος is Greek for 'silver'). 

Its site is located near Halkavala in Asiatic Turkey.

References

Populated places in ancient Pontus
Former populated places in Turkey